Trevor Colden (born March 14, 1994) is a professional skateboarder. He grew up in Virginia Beach, Virginia and later moved to Los Angeles, California when he was sixteen. He has won high ranking contest "Tampa Am" in 2011 and was one of three skateboarders to qualify for the Street League Nike SB World Tour. He currently rides for FTP Boards, Nike SB, Mountain Dew, Thunder Trucks, Mob Grip, Skullcandy, Spitfire, and Active RideShop.

Early life
Colden was born in Virginia Beach, Virginia, United States. He started skating at a young age and immediately started shredding. Every day, he would go out and skate.

Trevor went to Kings Fork Middle School and stopped going to school on his 7th grade year. In 2010, Trevor visited California and ended up staying there. He lived in San Diego and ended up getting a board sponsor.

Sponsors 
Colden is currently sponsored by FTP Boards, Vox shoes, Spitfire, Mountain Dew, Thunder Trucks, Mob Grip, Skullcandy, and Active RideShop. He rode for Emerica, Bones Wheels and Mystery. He had to pay $15,000 to get out of the contract with Mystery but with taxes around the corner, Trevor offered $10,000 and they accepted it. 

He switched from Mystery to Skate Mental with no contract. Also, he switched from Emerica to Nike SB and Bones Wheels to Spitfire. Trevor no longer rides for Skate Mental and has joined FTP Boards.

Videography

Contest History

Tampa Pro 
 Fourth Place: 2015
 Ninth Place: 2014

Dew Tour 
 Sixth Place: 2015 (Los Angeles)  
 Second Place: 2015 (Streetstyle/ Los Angeles) 
 Second Place: 2014 (Brooklyn) 
 First Place: 2014 (Streetstyle/ Brooklyn)

Tampa Am 
 Eleventh Place: 2013
 First Place: 2011

AmsterDamn Am 
 Third Place: 2013

Damn Am  
 Third Place: 2013 (Los Angeles) 
 Seventh Place: 2013 (Costa Mesa) 
 Second Place: 2011 (Woodward West)

Kimberly Diamond Cup Street 
 Sixth Place: 2013

Phoenix Am 
 Fifth Place: 2012 
 Eighth Place: 2011

Maloof Money Cup Am Street 
 Fifth Place: 2011 (NYC)

References

1994 births
Living people
American skateboarders
Sportspeople from Virginia Beach, Virginia
Sportspeople from Los Angeles